Kew is an unincorporated community in Menominee County, in the U.S. state of Michigan.

History
The community was named after the Kew Gardens in London.

References

Unincorporated communities in Menominee County, Michigan